Leonard Grover was a popular nineteenth century American comedic playwright. His best known plays are Davy Crockett and Our Boarding House, believed to be the origin of the phase 'make no mistake'.

References

19th-century American dramatists and playwrights
Year of birth missing
Year of death missing
American male dramatists and playwrights
19th-century American male writers